Pycnarmon meritalis is a moth in the family Crambidae. It was described by Francis Walker in 1859. It is found in Democratic Republic of the Congo (Katanga, West Kasai), South Africa, Australia, China, Sri Lanka, India, Indonesia (Borneo, Java, Sulawesi, Sumatra), Taiwan and Japan.

The wingspan is about 15 mm. Adults are white with several brown spots, mainly at the wing margins.

References

Spilomelinae
Moths described in 1859
Moths of Africa
Moths of Asia